Rick Byers (born c. 1958) is a Canadian politician, who was elected to the Legislative Assembly of Ontario in the 2022 provincial election. He represents the riding of Bruce—Grey—Owen Sound as a member of the Progressive Conservative Party of Ontario.

References 

Living people
Progressive Conservative Party of Ontario MPPs
21st-century Canadian politicians
1950s births